The demi-cannon was a medium-sized cannon, similar to but slightly larger than a culverin and smaller than a regular  cannon, developed in the early 17th century. A full cannon fired a 42-pound shot, but these were discontinued in the 18th century as they were seen as too unwieldy. The lower tiers of 18th century English warships were usually equipped with demi-cannons.

Ships featuring demi-cannons included HMS Sovereign of the Seas, HMS Resolution and HMS James, which fought in the Anglo-Dutch naval wars. Demi-cannons were also used on HMS Stirling Castle, the wreck of which was discovered in the Goodwin Sands. Several examples of this weapon were recovered from the site.

It required  of black powder to fire a  round shot.

These 32-pounders were used during the 18th century on first-rate ships of the line which carried up to 100 guns. Though powerful, the naval demi-cannons were inaccurate, except at close range, which allowed warships to cause as much damage as possible. Sometimes a single broadside was enough to cripple the enemy vessel.

References

Sources
 
 
 

Cannon
16th-century weapons
17th-century weapons
18th-century weapons
19th-century weapons